Dostluk ("friendship" in Turkmen) is a city in Köýtendag District, Lebap Province, Turkmenistan.  On 27 July 2016 by Resolution No. 425-V it was upgraded from town status to a city. In 2010 the village of Azatlyk was subordinated to Dostluk.

During the Soviet period, it was called Yuzhnyy ("southern") in Russian.

References

Populated places in Lebap Region